The Columbia Centre is a landmark office building situated in the heart of Bracknell town centre adjacent to the rail station, bus station and taxi rank and situated prominently on Market Street / Station Road. The building is currently undergoing a comprehensive refurbishment, an enhanced entrance and reception area will offer a new contemporary style to the building.

Buildings and structures in Berkshire
Bracknell